A Few Hours of Spring is a 2012 French drama film directed by Stéphane Brizé.

Plot 
After being released from prison, a man returns to his mother. Ill with terminal cancer, she decides to choose the time of her death.

Cast 
 Vincent Lindon as Alain Évrard
 Hélène Vincent as Yvette Évrard
 Emmanuelle Seigner as Clémence
 Olivier Perrier as Monsieur Lalouette
 Ludovic Berthillot as Bruno
 Silvia Kahn as Doctor Mathieu
 Véronique Montel as Madame Godard

Production 
The film was presented at the Locarno International Film Festival, the Toronto International Film Festival, the Festival do Rio, the Reykjavík International Film Festival, the Stockholm International Film Festival, the Dubai International Film Festival, the Glasgow Film Festival, the City of Lights, City of Angels.

References

External links 

2012 drama films
2012 films
French drama films
Films directed by Stéphane Brizé
Films scored by Nick Cave
Films scored by Warren Ellis (musician)
2010s French-language films
2010s French films